Andrew Jones (born 28 March 1964) is an Australian former cricketer. He played five first-class matches for New South Wales between 1987/88 and 1988/89.

See also
 List of New South Wales representative cricketers

References

External links
 

1964 births
Living people
Australian cricketers
New South Wales cricketers
People from Dubbo
Cricketers from New South Wales